George Maus Lowry (October 27, 1889 – September 25, 1981) served as a rear admiral in the United States Navy. He received the Medal of Honor for actions during the United States occupation of Veracruz, 1914. When he died in 1981 he was the last surviving Medal of Honor recipient of the occupation.

Life
Lowry was born in Erie, Pennsylvania on October 27, 1889, the son of Ricardo St. Phillip Lowry. After appointment to the United States Naval Academy, Lowry graduated on June 2, 1911.

He was married to Caroline Coleman, who died in 1979.

Service during United States occupation of Veracruz
Tasked with capturing the city's Customs House, Lowry's company became pinned down by "murderous rifle and machine-gun fire." Deciding not to risk his entire company in a frontal attack, Lowry instead asked for volunteers to approach the Customs House from the side. Five men volunteered: Joseph Gabriel Harner, Coxswain J. F. Schumaker, Boatswain's Mate Second Class George Cregan, and Seamen Harry C. Beasley and Lawrence C. Sinnett.

Lowry led the volunteers into a narrow alley, where they came under a crossfire from riflemen in the Customs Building and machine gunners in a nearby hotel. During this fighting, "A bullet clipped one of the buttons off Lowry's cap and another tore through his right legging, creasing the flesh. Beasley was slightly wounded, and Schumaker was shot through the head."

After his men were able to silence the machine gunners with return rifle fire, Lowry called for a corpsman to help Schumaker. Hospital Apprentice First Class William Zuiderveld ran down the alley and tried to stop the flow of blood from Schumaker's head, but was unable to do so. Schumaker soon died.

Once Zuiderveld carried Schumaker to the rear, Lowry and his surviving men worked their way up the alley and scaled the wall around the Custom's House. After Lowry and his men smashed through a window of the Customs House, the personnel inside surrendered.

Several days later, Lowry returned to the scene and counted twelve bullet impacts on the wall where his men had climbed it.

Lowry, along with almost all of the men who volunteered for the attack, received the Medal of Honor for his actions.

Medal of Honor citation
Rank and organization: Ensign, U.S. Navy. Place and date: Vera Cruz, Mexico, 21-April 22, 1914. Entered service at: Pennsylvania. Birth: Erie, Pa. G.O. No.: 177, December 4, 1915.

Citation:

For distinguished conduct in battle, engagements of Vera Cruz, 21–22 April 1914; Ens. Lowry was in both days' fighting at the head of his company, and was eminent and conspicuous in his conduct, leading his men with skill and courage.

Later career
Prior to leaving the Navy in 1927, he also served in the Bureau of Navigation.

In 1940 Lowry was recalled to the active service in the Navy as captain and served as assistant operations officer in the 12th Naval District. After the Japanese attack on Pearl Harbor, Lowry was transferred to the staff of the Commander Western Sea Frontier first under the command of Rear Admiral David W. Bagley and then under Admiral Royal E. Ingersoll. In this capacity, Lowry was appointed an operations officer and as convoy and routing officer of the Western Sea Frontier."

For his service in this capacity, Lowry was decorated with the Legion of Merit. Lowry was relieved of all active duties in September 1946 and subsequently retired one month later. He was advanced to the rank of rear admiral on the retired list due to having been specially commended in combat.

Decorations

Here is the ribbon bar of Rear Admiral George M. Lowry:

Later life
After the war, Lowry wrote several articles which were printed in the United States Naval Institute magazine Proceedings, including "Exploits of the U-53," "The Clipperton Operations" and "L-16: Mystery No Longer." After his death in 1981, he was buried at sea per his previous request.  There is currently a professorship in his honor at the Naval War College in Newport, Rhode Island.

See also

List of Medal of Honor recipients (Veracruz)

References

External links

1889 births
1981 deaths
People from Erie, Pennsylvania
United States Naval Academy alumni
United States Navy Medal of Honor recipients
United States Navy admirals
United States Navy personnel of World War I
United States Navy World War II admirals
Burials at sea
Recipients of the Legion of Merit
Battle of Veracruz (1914) recipients of the Medal of Honor
Military personnel from Pennsylvania